Freistadt District was a political district (equivalent to okres in the Czech Republic and powiat in Poland) in Austrian Silesia, Austria-Hungary existing between 1868 and 1920 (superseded by Czechoslovak Okres Fryštát). Its administrative center was the town of Freistadt (now administratively a part of the city of Karviná, Czech Republic).

History 
Revolutions of 1848 in the Austrian Empire led to various social, legal and also administrative reforms. In the late December 1849 Austrian Silesia was re-established and was initially subdivided into seven political districts, additionally divided into legal districts (German: Gerichtsbezirk). Freistadt became a seat of legal district in Teschen political district. In the era of Bach's neo-absolutism political districts were abolished and replaced by district offices (German: Bezirksamt) encompassing territories of the abolished legal districts. Political districts were re-established in 1868. Freistadt became then the seat of the newly established Freistadt political district. It consisted of two legal districts: Freistadt and Oderberg (Czech: Bohumín, Polish: Bogumin; before 1855 belonging to Friedek political district).

In 1880 Freistadt political district was administratively divided into 40 municipalities (23 in Freistadt legal district and 17 in Oderberg). Before 1890 Muglinau (Muglinov) was separated from Herzmanitz (Heřmanice) and Dittmannsdorf (Dětmarovice) was moved from Oderberg legal district to Freistadt legal district. On 1 January 1904 7 municipalities were excluded from Oderberg legal district to form a new Polnish Ostrau (Polská/Slezská Ostrava) legal district in Friedek political district. Before 1910 also Wirbitz (Vrbice) was separated from Pudlau (Pudlov), which was then merged with Oderberg. After this changes Freistadt political district consisted of 34 municipalities (24 in Freistadt legal district and 10 in Oderberg).

According to the censuses conducted in 1880, 1890, 1900 and 1910 this 34 municipalities (317 km²) had a combined population of:

Such a large growth in population was owing to an industrial development within the district luring a large influx of migrant workers, mostly from western Galicia. Traditionally the area in most parts was inhabited by Silesian Lachs speaking Cieszyn Silesian dialect. After World War I and fall of Austria-Hungary the region of Cieszyn Silesia including the territory of Freistadt political district became disputed land between Czechoslovakia and Poland. This led to Polish–Czechoslovak War and the division of the region and district on 28 July 1920, by a decision of the Spa Conference. Majority of the municipalities became a part of Czechoslovakia (with the district being afterwards known as Okres Fryštát) and only the easternmost municipalities became a part of Poland, and were then transferred to Cieszyn County.

Municipal division 

As of 1910:

Freistadt legal district (Gerichtsbezirk Freistadt)
 Albersdorf
 Altstadt
 Darkau
 Dittmannsdorf
 Dombrau (market town)
 Freistadt (town)
 Karwin (market town)
 Katschitz
 Gross Kuntschitz
 Klein Kuntschitz
 Lazy
 Lonkau
 Marklowitz (now Marklowice Górne, Poland and Dolní Marklovice, Czech Republic)
 Orlau (market town)
 Petrowitz
 Piersna
 Poremba
 Roj
 Seibersdorf
 Steinau
 Mittel Suchau
 Nieder Suchau
 Ober Suchau
 Zawada

Oderberg legal district (Gerichtsbezirk Oderberg)
 Deutschleuten
 Oderberg (town)
 Peterswald
 Polnischleuten
 Reichwaldau
 Schönichel
 Skrzeczon
 Wilmersdorf
 Wirbitz
 Zablacz

See also 
 Frysztat County
 Karviná District

References 

Districts of Austria
Habsburg Silesia
Cieszyn Silesia
History of Czech Silesia